Justina Vanagaitė  (born 3 January 1990) is an Lithuanian dressage rider. Representing Lithuania, she competed at the 2022 World Equestrian Games and at the 2021 European Dressage Championships. She placed 44th place in individual dressage at the 2022 World Equestrian Games with her horse Nabab.

Personal
Justina started riding at the age of 13. She is a founder of Vilnius equestrian club.

Personal bests

References

Living people
1990 births
Lithuanian dressage riders